Vinařice may refer to places in the Czech Republic:

Vinařice (Beroun District), a municipality and village
Vinařice (Kladno District), a municipality and village
Vinařice (Louny District), a municipality and village
Vinařice (Mladá Boleslav District), a municipality and village
Vinařice, a village and part of Jirkov
Vinařice, a village and part of Týnec nad Labem